Armin Wiebe (born 17 June 1948) is a Canadian writer of Russian Mennonite descent born in Altona, Manitoba, best known for his humorous novels about Mennonites. Wiebe is regarded as one of the pioneers of humorous Mennonite writing in English and is known for his incorporation of Plautdietsch words within his English texts.

Beginning with The Salvation of Yasch Siemens, which was shortlisted for the Stephen Leacock Award for Humour in 1984, Wiebe has published several humorous novels about Mennonites. He followed up this book with Murder in Gutenthal and The Second Coming of Yeeat Shpanst, all published by Turnstone Press. Wiebe has also written plays and short stories about Mennonites and has published a collection of short stories entitled "Armin's Shorts'. His stage play The Moonlight Sonata of Beethoven Blatz premiered to sold-out houses at Theatre Projects Manitoba in April 2011. 'Wine and Little Breads' received an Honourable Mention in the 2019 Herman Voaden National Playwriting Competition sponsored by Queen's University's Dan School of Drama and Music.

His novel Tatsea is a work of historic fiction, which diverges significantly from his Mennonite writing, and depicts the Dogrib people of the Canadian Subarctic in the 1700s. The book won both the McNally Robinson Book of the Year Award and the Margaret Laurence Award for Fiction in 2003.

Wiebe holds degrees from the University of Manitoba and the University of Winnipeg and taught creative writing at Red River College in Winnipeg, Manitoba for twelve years.

Bibliography
 The Salvation of Yasch Siemens (1984)
The Salvation of Yasch Siemens 35th Anniversary Turnstone Selects Edition (2019)
 Murder in Gutenthal (1991)
 Second Coming of Yeeat Shpanst (1995)
 Tatsea (2003)
 The Moonlight Sonata of Beethoven Blatz (2011)
 Armin's Shorts (2015)
 Grandmother, Laughing'' (2017)

References

External links
 Official site

1948 births
Canadian humorists
Canadian male novelists
Canadian Mennonites
Living people
Mennonite writers
Mennonite humorists
People from Pembina Valley Region, Manitoba
Writers from Winnipeg